The Sanremo Music Festival 1980 was the 30th annual Sanremo Music Festival, held at the Teatro Ariston in Sanremo, province of Imperia between 7 and 9 February 1980. The final night was broadcast by Rai 1, while the first two nights were broadcast live only on radio.

The show was hosted by  Claudio Cecchetto, assisted by  actors Roberto Benigni and Olimpia Carlisi.  Daniele Piombi hosted the segments from the Sanremo Casino, where a number of guests performed.

The winner of the Festival was Toto Cutugno with the song "Solo noi".

Participants and results

References 

Sanremo Music Festival by year
1980 in Italian music
1980 music festivals